An actuator is a component of a machine that is responsible for moving and controlling a mechanism or system, for example by opening a valve. In simple terms, it is a "mover".

An actuator requires a control device (controlled by control signal) and a source of energy. The control signal is relatively low energy and may be electric voltage or current, pneumatic, or hydraulic fluid pressure, or even human power. Its main energy source  may be an electric current, hydraulic pressure, or pneumatic pressure. The control device is usually a valve. When it receives a control signal, an actuator responds by converting the source's energy into mechanical motion. In the electric, hydraulic, and pneumatic sense, it is a form of automation or automatic control.

The displacement achieved is commonly linear or rotational, as exemplified by linear motors and rotary motors, respectively. Rotary motion is more natural for small machines making large displacements. By means of a leadscrew, rotary motion can be adapted to function as a linear actuator (a linear motion, but not a linear motor).

History
The history of the pneumatic actuation system and the hydraulic actuation system dates to around the time of World War II (1938). It was first created by Xhiter Anckeleman who used his knowledge of engines and brake systems to come up with a new solution to ensure that the brakes on a car exert the maximum force, with the least possible wear and tear.

Types of actuators

Soft actuator

A soft actuator is one that changes its shape in response to stimuli including mechanical, thermal, magnetic, and electrical. Soft actuators mainly deal with the robotics of humans rather than industry which is what most of the actuators are used for. For most actuators they are mechanically durable yet do not have an ability to adapt compared to soft actuators. The soft actuators apply to mainly safety and healthcare for humans which is why they are able to adapt to environments by disassembling their parts. This is why the driven energy behind soft actuators deal with flexible materials like certain polymers and liquids that are harmless to humans.

Hydraulic

The hydraulic actuator consists of  cylinder or fluid motor that uses hydraulic power to facilitate mechanical operation. The mechanical motion gives an output in terms of linear, rotatory or oscillatory motion. As liquids are nearly impossible to compress, a hydraulic actuator can exert a large force. The drawback of this approach is its limited acceleration.

The hydraulic cylinder consists of a hollow cylindrical tube along which a piston can slide. The term single acting is used when the fluid pressure is applied to just one side of the piston. The piston can move in only one direction, a spring being frequently used to give the piston a return stroke. The term double acting is used when pressure is applied on each side of the piston; any difference in force between the two sides of the piston moves the piston to one side or the other.

Pneumatic

Pneumatic actuators enable considerable forces to be produced from relatively small pressure changes. Pneumatic energy is desirable for main engine controls because it can quickly respond in starting and stopping as the power source does not need to be stored in reserve for operation. Moreover, pneumatic actuators are cheaper, and often more powerful than other actuators. These forces are often used with valves to move diaphragms to affect the flow of air through the valve.

The advantage of pneumatic actuators consists exactly in the high level of force available in a relatively small volume. While the main drawback of the technology consists in the need for a compressed air network composed of several components such as compressors, reservoirs, filters, dryers, air treatment subsystems, valves, tubes, etc. which makes the technology energy inefficient with energy losses that can sum up to 95%

Electric

Since 1960, several actuator technologies have been developed, Electric actuators can be classified in the following groups:

Electromechanical actuator (EMA) 
It converts the rotational force of an electric rotary motor into a linear movement to generate the requested linear movement through a mechanism either a belt (Belt Drive axis with stepper or servo) or a screw (either a ball or a lead screw or planetary roller screw )

The main advantages of electromechanical actuators are their relatively good level of accuracy with respect to pneumatics, their possible long lifecycle and the little maintenance effort required (might require grease). It is possible to reach relatively high force, on the order of 100 kN.

The main limitation of these actuators are the reachable speed, the important dimensions and weight they require.
While the main application of such actuators is mainly seen in  health care devices and factory automation.

Electrohydraulic actuator 
Another approach is an electrohydraulic actuator, where the electric motor remains the prime mover but provides torque to operate a hydraulic accumulator that is then used to transmit actuation force in much the same way that diesel engine/hydraulics are typically used in heavy equipment.

Electrical energy is used to actuate equipment such as multi-turn valves, or electric-powered construction and excavation equipment.

When used to control the flow of fluid through a valve, a brake is typically installed above the motor to prevent the fluid pressure from forcing open the valve.  If no brake is installed, the actuator gets activated to reclose the valve, which is slowly forced open again.  This sets up an oscillation (open, close, open ...) and the motor and actuator will eventually become damaged.

Linear motor 
Linear motors are different from electromechanical actuators, they work with the same principle as electric rotary motors, in effect it can be thought as a rotary motor which has been cut and unrolled. Thus, instead of producing a rotational movement, they produce a linear force along their length. Because linear motors cause lower friction losses than other devices, some linear motor products can last over a hundred million cycles.

Linear motors are divided in 3 basic categories: flat linear motor (classic), U-Channel linear motors and Tubular linear motors.

Linear motor technology is the best solution in the context of a low load (up to 30Kgs) because it provides the highest level of speed, control and accuracy.

In fact, it represents the most desired and versatile technology. Due to the limitations of pneumatics, the current electric actuator technology is a viable solution for specific industry applications and it has been successfully introduced in market segments such as the watchmaking, semiconductor and pharmaceutical industries (as high as 60% of the applications. The growing interest for this technology, can be explained by the following characteristics:

 High precision (equal or less than 0,1 mm);
 High cycling rate (greater than 100 cycles/min);
 Possible usage in clean and highly-regulated environments (no leakages of air, humidity or lubricants allowed);
 Need for programmable motion in the situation of complex operations

The main disadvantages of linear motors are:

 They are expensive respect to pneumatics and other electric technologies. 
 They are not easy to integrate in standard machineries due to their important size and high weight.
 They have a low force density respect to pneumatic and electromechanical actuators.

Rotary motor

Rotary motors are actuators that use a piece of energy to form an oscillatory motion at a certain angle of movement. Rotary actuators can have up to a rotation of 360 degrees. This allows it to differ from a linear motor as the linear is bound to a set distance compared to the rotary motor. Rotary motors have the ability to be set at any given degree in a field making the device easier to set up still with durability and a set torque.

Rotary motors can be powered by 3 different techniques such as Electric, Fluid, or Manual. However, Fluid powered rotary actuators have 5 sub-sections of actuators such as Scotch Yoke, Vane, Rack-and-Pinion, Helical, and Electrohydraulic. All forms have their own specific design and use allowing the ability to choose multiple angles of degree.

Applications for the rotary actuators are just about endless but, will more than likely be found dealing with mostly hydraulic pressured devices and industries. Rotary actuators are even used in the robotics field when seeing robotic arms in industry lines. Anything you see that deals with motion control systems to perform a task in technology is a good chance to be a rotary actuator.

Thermal or magnetic

Actuators which can be actuated by applying thermal or magnetic energy to a solid-state material have been used in commercial applications. Thermal actuators can be triggered by temperature or heating through the Joule effect and tend to be compact, lightweight, economical and with high power density. These actuators use shape memory materials such as shape-memory alloys (SMAs) or magnetic shape-memory alloys (MSMAs).

Mechanical

A mechanical actuator functions to execute movement by converting one kind of motion, such as rotary motion, into another kind, such as linear motion. An example is a rack and pinion. The operation of mechanical actuators is based on combinations of structural components, such as gears and rails, or pulleys and chains.

3D printed soft actuators

The majority of the existing soft actuators are fabricated using multistep low yield processes such as micro-moulding, solid freeform fabrication, and mask lithography. However, these methods require manual fabrication of devices, post processing/assembly, and lengthy iterations until maturity in the fabrication is achieved. To avoid the tedious and time-consuming aspects of the current fabrication processes, researchers are exploring an appropriate manufacturing approach for effective fabrication of soft actuators. Therefore, special soft systems that can be fabricated in a single step by rapid prototyping methods, such as 3D printing, are utilized to narrow the gap between the design and implementation of soft actuators, making the process faster, less expensive, and simpler. They also enable incorporation of all actuator components into a single structure eliminating the need to use external joints, adhesives, and fasteners.

Shape memory polymer (SMP) actuators are the most similar to our muscles, providing a response to a range of stimuli such as light, electrical, magnetic, heat, pH, and moisture changes. They have some deficiencies including fatigue and high response time that have been improved through the introduction of smart materials and combination of different materials by means of advanced fabrication technology. The advent of 3D printers has made a new pathway for fabricating low-cost and fast response SMP actuators. The process of receiving external stimuli like heat, moisture, electrical input, light or magnetic field by SMP is referred to as shape memory effect (SME). SMP exhibits some rewarding features such a low density, high strain recovery, biocompatibility, and biodegradability.

Photopolymer/light activated polymers (LAP) are another type of SMP that are activated by light stimuli. The LAP actuators can be controlled remotely with instant response and, without any physical contact, only with the variation of light frequency or intensity.

A need for soft, lightweight and biocompatible soft actuators in soft robotics has influenced researchers for devising pneumatic soft actuators because of their intrinsic compliance nature and ability to produce muscle tension.

Polymers such as dielectric elastomers (DE), ionic polymer metal composites (IPMC), ionic electroactive polymers, polyelectrolyte gels, and gel-metal composites are common materials to form 3D layered structures that can be tailored to work as soft actuators. EAP actuators are categorized as 3D printed soft actuators that respond to electrical excitation as deformation in their shape.

Examples and applications 
In engineering, actuators are frequently used as mechanisms to introduce motion, or to clamp an object so as to prevent motion. In electronic engineering, actuators are a subdivision of transducers. They are devices which transform an input signal (mainly an electrical signal) into some form of motion.

Examples of actuators
 Comb drive
 Digital micromirror device 
 Electric motor
 Electroactive polymer
 Hydraulic cylinder
 Piezoelectric actuator
 Plasma actuator
 Pneumatic actuator
 Screw jack
 Servomechanism
 Solenoid
 Stepper motor
 Shape-memory alloy
 Thermal bimorph
 Hydraulic actuators
 Trim actuator, in aircraft design

Circular to linear conversion
Motors are mostly used when circular motions are needed, but can also be used for linear applications by transforming circular to linear motion with a lead screw or similar mechanism. On the other hand, some actuators are intrinsically linear, such as piezoelectric actuators.  Conversion between circular and linear motion is commonly made via a few simple types of mechanism including:
 Screw: Screw jack, ball screw and roller screw actuators all operate on the principle of the simple machine known as the screw. By rotating the actuator's nut, the screw shaft moves in a line.  By moving the screw shaft, the nut rotates.
 Wheel and axle: Hoist, winch, rack and pinion, chain drive, belt drive, rigid chain and rigid belt actuators operate on the principle of the wheel and axle. By rotating a wheel/axle (e.g. drum, gear, pulley or shaft) a linear member (e.g. cable, rack, chain or belt) moves.  By moving the linear member, the wheel/axle rotates.

Virtual instrumentation
In virtual instrumentation, actuators and sensors are the hardware complements of virtual instruments.

Performance metrics 
Performance metrics for actuators include speed, acceleration, and force (alternatively, angular speed, angular acceleration, and torque), as well as energy efficiency and considerations such as mass, volume, operating conditions, and durability, among others.

Force
When considering force in actuators for applications, two main metrics should be considered. These two are static and dynamic loads. Static load is the force capability of the actuator while not in motion. Conversely, the dynamic load of the actuator is the force capability while in motion.

Speed
Speed should be considered primarily at a no-load pace, since the speed will invariably decrease as the load amount increases. The rate the speed will decrease will directly correlate with the amount of force and the initial speed.

Operating conditions
Actuators are commonly rated using the standard IP Code rating system. Those that are rated for dangerous environments will have a higher IP rating than those for personal or common industrial use.

Durability
This will be determined by each individual manufacturer, depending on usage and quality.

See also

References